Bunica is a tourist resort located in a cove just northwest of the town of Senj, Croatia. It was not registered as a standalone settlement by census 2001. It is located by the D8 highway.

References

Populated places in Lika-Senj County